Choqeh-ye Sorkh-e Bahram Beygi (also Romanized as Choqeh-ye Sorkh-e Bahrām Beygī; also known as Choqeh-ye Sorkh) is a village in Pataveh Rural District, Pataveh District, Dana County, Kohgiluyeh and Boyer-Ahmad Province, Iran. At the 2006 census, its population was 28, in 5 families.

References 

Populated places in Dana County